Tim Montana (born January 5, 1985) is an American singer and songwriter. His single "This Beard Came Here to Party" (co-written with Billy Gibbons of ZZ Top) was adopted by the Boston Red Sox as the theme song of their 2013 post-season run.

Early life 
Tim Montana (Tim Pasquenzo) was born on January 5, 1985, in Kalispell, Montana and raised in Butte, Montana. Tim was given his first guitar at the age of six. Since his family's trailer had no electricity, Tim taught himself to play by candlelight. He later performed in school talent shows. After graduating from Butte High School in 2003, he moved to Los Angeles to study music.

Musical career 
It was while living in Los Angeles where Tim met guitarist and producer Johnny Hiland and with Hiland's encouragement moved to Nashville and began playing country and southern rock. His debut album, Iron Horse, was produced by Hiland (who also played guitar and sang backup) and released on the CD Baby label on August 21, 2007.

Earlier that same year, late-night talk show host David Letterman met Montana prior to Montana's Independence Day concert in Choteau, Montana. Months later, Letterman personally invited Montana to appear on The Late Show with David Letterman. Montana performed his song "Butte, America" on the October 17, 2008, program broadcast.

In 2013, Montana recruited guitarist Kyle Rife, drummer Brian Wolff, and bassist Bryce Paul to perform as Tim Montana and the Shrednecks. During a studio session on September 11, 2013, Montana was introduced to ZZ Top founder Billy Gibbons. Their meeting resulted in an impromptu songwriting collaboration, during which the two co-wrote and recorded the single "This Beard Came Here to Party." The Boston Red Sox (known at the time for beards they'd grown during the playoffs) adopted the song as their anthem during the lead-up to the 2013 World Series. The Shrednecks and Gibbons recorded a custom version for the post-season (with lyrics referencing Red Sox highlights and Boston landmarks). Montana and the band later returned to sing The Star-Spangled Banner at Fenway Park at a May 28, 2013, ceremony honoring the winning 2004 World Series Red Sox team.

Montana and Gibbons would go on to share credits on three other songs: "Fifty Fifty," “Weed and Whiskey," and "Rust and Red." The last of these received its broadcast debut during the Fox News show The Five during an interview with Navy SEAL Team 6 member Robert J. O'Neill, subject of the Fox News documentary The Man Who Killed Osama bin Laden. O’Neill, a fellow native of Butte, had previously become acquainted with Montana through O’Neill's brother Tom, a radio DJ and early supporter of Montana's music. Robert J. O'Neill later featured prominently in the 2017 music video for Montana's single "Hillbilly Rich".

Following the release of "This Beard Came Here to Party," Gibbons invited Tim Montana to open for ZZ Top on tour. Tim Montana and the Shrednecks have continued to appear with ZZ Top and opened for Kid Rock on various tour dates during the summer of 2016.

On February 24, 2016, Tim Montana released the album Tim Montana and the Shrednecks, featuring Gibbons on four tracks.

Tim Montana released the single "Hillbilly Rich" on September 8, 2017. He released a video for the song on September 19 which features friend Robert J. O'Neill and "Streetbike" Tommy Passemante from MTV's Nitro Circus. In their review of the video, Rolling Stone wrote that its "aspirational swagger is perfectly on message for Montana's eclectic musical influences". Actor Charlie Sheen took an interest in the video stating on Twitter "this is a stone-cold masterpiece! my man is flat out KILLIN THE GAME" to his millions of followers.

Montana wrote two songs which Kid Rock recorded for release as singles and are featured on the 2017 tour "Greatest Show on Earth".  The song "Tennessee Mountain Top" is receiving airplay on Country radio stations.

Personal life 
Montana is a vocal supporter of U.S. military veterans. After watching the film American Sniper (which tells the story of the late U.S. Navy SEAL Chris Kyle), Montana became involved in the welfare of veterans suffering from Posttraumatic stress disorder. He approached Gibson guitars to create a custom Chris Kyle guitar, decorated with Kyle's skull-and-crosshairs logo. The guitar was auctioned off, raising $117,500 for the Guardians of Heroes Foundation, helping wounded U.S. soldiers.

Montana and his wife Danielle are the parents of four children and currently reside in Nashville, Tennessee.

Discography

Studio albums 
 Iron Horse (2008)
 Tim Montana and the Shrednecks (2016)
 American Thread (2020)
 Reno (2022)
Long Shots (2022)

Singles 
 Butte, America (2008)
 Rust and Red (featuring Billy Gibbons) (2014)
 This Beard Came Here to Party (with Billy Gibbons) (2016)
 Weed and Whiskey (2016)
 Amarula Sun (with Mac McAnally) (2017)
 Mostly Stoned (2019)
 Hillbilly Rich (2020)
 American Thread (2020)
 Bury Me By the Bonfire (2020)
 Quarantine (With Mat Best) (2020)
 Be A Cowboy (2020)

Music videos 
 Butte America (2008)
 Too Far Gone (2012)
 This Beard Came Here to Party (2013)
 Glass and Chicken Wire (2017)
 Hillbilly Rich (2017)
 American Thread (2019)

References

External links 
 Official Website

1985 births
American rock singers
American country singer-songwriters
American country rock singers
American male guitarists
American rock guitarists
American country guitarists
Living people
Singers from Montana
21st-century American male singers
21st-century American singers
21st-century American guitarists